10 Anos Depois is the tenth album by Brazilian musical artist Jorge Ben, released in 1973. It is a collection of popular songs from the first decade of his career re-recorded as medleys.

Track listing 
All songs composed by Jorge Ben.

References

Jorge Ben albums
1973 albums
Philips Records albums
Albums produced by Paulinho Tapajós